Mike Boland may refer to:

Michael Boland (cinematographer), played for the Philadelphia Flyers of the NHL and the Ottawa Nationals of the WHA before becoming an Emmy Award-winning documentary cinematographer
Mike Boland (ice hockey, born 1954) (1954–2017), played for the Buffalo Sabres and the Kansas City Scouts of the NHL
Mike Boland (politician) (born 1942), served in Illinois House of Representatives 1995–2010